Tangshan Earthquake Memorial Park is located to the east of Nanhu Park, Tangshan, China. The park in built in memory of the 1976 Tangshan earthquake. The Tangshan Earthquake Museum, the Tangshan earthquake ruins at Tangshan Rolling Stock and the memorial walls engraved with names of the earthquake victims are in the park.

References

Monuments and memorials in China
Parks in Hebei